Hannu Rajaniemi (born 15 September 1953) is a Finnish former footballer. During his club career, Rajaniemi played for Sepsi-78, MP Mikkeli, Lapuan Virkiä and TP-55 Seinäjoki. He made 7 appearances for the Finland national football team from 1980 to 1981, scoring 2 goals.

External links

1955 births
2008 deaths
Finnish footballers
Finland international footballers
Sepsi-78 players
Lapuan Virkiä players
Association football forwards
People from Seinäjoki
Mestaruussarja players
Sportspeople from South Ostrobothnia